Tolsti Vrh pri Ravnah na Koroškem is a dispersed settlement in the hills north of Ravne na Koroškem in the Carinthia region in northern Slovenia. A small part of the settlement lies in the Municipality of Dravograd.

References

External links
Tolsti Vrh pri Ravnah na Koroškem on Geopedia

Populated places in the Municipality of Dravograd